The Academies Enterprise Trust (AET) is a multi-academy trust in England. It is a non-profit, educational charitable trust, which sponsors schools with academy status.

History

Formally established in 2008 by the Greensward Charitable Trust (established in 1996 to support Greensward School). The first school in the trust was Greensward Academy, at Hockley, Essex. The Trust began growing in 2008 with 3 schools. At its largest the chain numbered 76 schools. By 2015, AET had contracted to 68 schools.  

Hockley Academy joined the trust in September 2018. As of 2021, AET has 58 schools and has been given the green light by the Department for Education to take on further primary and SEN schools.

Between 2011 and 2012 AET more than doubled in size, leading to criticism that the Academy chain was growing too fast and was therefore unable to ensure appropriate standards in its schools.

The first Chief Executive Officer (CEO) of AET was David Triggs, who was in post from 2008 until September 2013. The second CEO was Ian Comfort, who had been Group Secretary and General Counsel since 2009. In 2016, the new Board of Trustees appointed Julian Drinkall as the new CEO, with Mr Drinkall taking up post from December 2016.

In May 2019, AET faced a threatened vote of no confidence from staff with concerns being raised over workload, pay progression and the salary of Executives. Ultimately, the unions called off the vote of no confidence.

Summer 2019 also saw the organisation celebrating Naveed Idrees, Headteacher of Feversham Primary School, being awarded Headteacher of the Year in the TES annual teaching awards.

In October 2019, Julian Drinkall accused parent-governors of being "playground bully parents", and the AET removed parents from its governing bodies, despite criticism from the National Governance Association.

Controversy

Academic standards

Prior to 2017, AET struggled with academic results. Since 2017, results improved for the summer 2017 Key Stage 2 results, and in summer 2019 in Key Stage 2, 4 and 5.  In some cases results were slightly higher than the national average.

Historically, OFSTED had criticised standards across AET in reports in both 2014 and 2015, as well as criticising standards in a number of individual schools. In 2014, half the schools in AET were reported as failing as OFSTED criticised 'low expectations. AET responded in 2014 to OFSTED's concerns about its standards being too low by saying that OFSTED had an unfairly negative slant against AET in their report and that "exam results in AET schools were improving faster than average".

In 2015 Sir Michael Wilshaw, the head of OFSTED wrote to the Secretary of State in England complaining about standards in the largest multi-academy trusts, including AET. a comment which Sir Michael made in the light of AET's own comments on attendance.

In its submission to the Parliamentary Select Committee on Multi Academy Trusts, AET stated that it would prefer a peer review model of monitoring, thus eradicating the need for OFSTED inspections of its academies.

In 2016 The DfE published comparative data looking at how the Multi Academy Trusts were performing and stated that AET students were doing less well than other pupils in comparable non AET schools at KS4, but were amongst the highest performers at KS2.

Expansion
When AET was criticised for expanding too fast and not ensuring high enough academic standards, there was controversy over whether AET was 'barred' or 'banned' from expanding; or whether AET itself had chosen not to expand. Mike Barnett, on behalf of AET said that 

Despite this insistent AET claim that 'we have not been barred from expanding' the number of AET schools then fell to 68 and a report for the Parliamentary Select Committee on Education explicitly contradicted AET's claim, stating that AET "has been barred from taking on more schools because of concerns that its rapid expansion was adversely affecting standards." Education Minister Edward Timpson said that "At 27 February 2014, 14 sponsors were restricted in full from sponsoring new academies or free schools out of a total of over 350 approved sponsors that currently support academies." Responding to queries about bans which prevent Multi-Academy Trusts expanding, a spokesman for the Department for Education said  At the same time, the then shadow Education minister Steve McCabe MP commented "...If they are not good enough to take on any new schools why are they good enough to run existing schools...?"

Under the leadership of Julian Drinkall, DfE Ministers gave AET the green light to grow again. In September 2018, Hockley Primary School (an Oftsed rated 'Outstanding' primary school in Essex) joined AET, and the trust was permitted to enter into discussions for further primary schools and SEN schools to join the organisation.

Financial management and controversies
As well as educational performance, AET's financial health has also been transformed since 2017. Having posted many years of multi-million pound deficits, January 2020 saw AET announce a second year of surpluses in the publication of year-end annual accounts.

Historically, the position had been less positive, with AET's income falling considerably between 2013 and 2014.

The 40% drop in funding between 2013 and 2014 was reported as due to large transfers of extra funding from Local Authorities to help it take on Academies which needed improvements. Following the worsening financial situation and a range of additional concerns about AET's finances, AET was given a Financial Notice to improve on 23 October 2014. The Notice to Improve letter stated 

At that time that the Educational Funding Agency (EFA) queried AET's competence with financial planning, it had only used its powers to issue a Financial Warning on eight occasions. In a later submission to a Parliamentary Select Committee, Ian Comfort, the CEO of AET queried the ability of the Education Funding Agency to continue working as it does, unless something changed. The DfE (and Dame Rachel de Souza, CEO of the Inspiration Trust) robustly rejected his criticisms, saying that the EFA systems were efficient and suitable.

As of 17 December 2015, 27 Financial Notices to Improve have been served upon Multi Academy Trusts, only 16 of which were still open as 11 of the organisations initially queried had improved and had their Notice to Improve removed. In its 2014 Annual Report, AET stated that the trust expected the EFA Notice to Improve to be lifted by March 2015. However the Financial Warning Notice remained in place in Autumn 2015. In the September 2015 AET Board meeting, the CEO Ian Comfort was cited explaining the situation by saying that he had not even been aware of the crucial deadline for reporting to the Education Funding Agency, and that was why the paperwork was not submitted that would have enabled the Financial Notice to Improve, to be lifted. The Notice to Improve was still in place at the end of August 2016.

The Financial Notice to Improve was lifted in summer 2017, following the radical Turnaround Plan developed and implemented by the current CEO, Julian Drinkall. The removal of the FNTI also meant that AET was able to engage in discussions about new academies joining the trust where it made sense to do so.

In terms of the difficulties AET has in managing its finances, it has identified PFI contracts as a key issue which make it difficult to manage its finances.

Financial concerns have been raised in the media about the fact that AET paid almost £500,000 to private businesses owned by its trustees and executives. Ian Comfort, who as CEO was reported as earning £220,000 per annum, was reported to receive £329,000 in addition to his salary for "project management services". Commenting on these 'related party payments' Russell Hobby, the General Secretary of the NAHT said: "it is time for them to stop... It risks eroding the high trust in which the teaching profession is held because it shields decisions and payments from proper scrutiny."

AET salaries have also been a matter of controversy. In 2013 the press reported that the number of staff paid six-figure salaries in AET had risen almost fivefold in a two-year period. Despite overall numbers of staffing dropping in 2014, the numbers of staff paid at the highest levels went up: in 2013 there were 22 staff recorded with salaries between £100,000 and £229,000. In 2014 there were 26 staff paid in the same range. Jon Richards, the Education officer of the union UNISON said "The explosion in senior pay across many academy trusts over the past few years is completely disproportionate... In the same period, school support staff have endured year upon year of pay freezes and real-term pay cuts." In a review of CEO pay in 2015 it was also noted publicly that Ian Comfort, the CEO of AET is responsible for 67 schools and was paid £220,000 while the CEO of Plymouth Cast Multi Academy Trust was paid £53,000 and is responsible for 35 schools. By 2016 it was noted that Ian Comfort was earning £225,000, a 2% increase on the previous year. At the same time, classroom teachers were limited to pay rises of just 1%.

In recognition of the challenging financial environment, the CEO, Julian Drinkall, waived a salary increase for 2018 and 2019.

AET is essentially a group of schools. However, at its largest in 2014 AET was employing 6149 staff, of which less than half (2784) were teachers. This has led to questioning of its funding priorities, especially given the OFSTED criticisms of its standards. Further concerns have been raised about spending priorities with criticisms of what has been reported as AET's culture of "lavish expense claims."

In 2014 AET announced a plan for a joint venture with a commercial partner (reported as Price Waterhouse Coopers) which would have seen up to £400m of support services outsourced. Although unable to go ahead in with the full joint venture, in 2015 AET put out to tender some aspects of the central services which would have fallen within its scope.

Primary schools

Anglesey Primary Academy, Burton-upon-Trent
Ashingdon Primary Academy, Essex
Barton Hill Academy, Torquay
Beacon Academy, Loughborough
Brockworth Primary Academy, Gloucestershire
Caldicotes Primary Academy, Middlesbrough
Charles Warren Academy, Milton Keynes
Cottingley Primary Academy, Leeds
Feversham Primary Academy, Bradford
Four Dwellings Primary Academy, Birmingham
The Green Way Academy, Kingston upon Hull
Hall Road Academy, Kingston upon Hull
Hamford Primary Academy, Walton-on-the-Naze
Hazelwood Academy, Swindon
Langer Primary Academy, Felixstowe
Lea Forest Primary Academy, Birmingham
Meadstead Primary Academy, South Yorkshire
Montgomery Primary Academy, Birmingham
Newington Academy, Kingston upon Hull
Noel Park Primary School, North London
North Ormesby Primary Academy, Middlesbrough
North Thoresby Primary Academy, North Thoresby
Offa's Mead Academy, Gloucestershire
Percy Shurmer Academy, Birmingham
Plumberow Primary Academy, Essex
Severn View Primary Academy, Stroud
Shafton Primary Academy, Barnsley
St James the Great Academy, Kent
St Helen's Primary Academy, Barnsley
Trinity Primary Academy, Wood Green
Utterby Primary Academy, Utterby
Westerings Primary Academy, Essex
Weston Academy, Totland

Secondary schools

Aylward Academy Edmonton
Bexleyheath Academy Greater London
Broadlands Academy Bristol
Clacton Coastal Academy Clacton-on-sea
Firth Park Academy Sheffield
Four Dwellings Academy Birmingham
Greensward Academy Essex
Greenwood Academy Birmingham
Kingsley Academy London
Kingswood Academy Kingston upon Hull
Maltings Academy Essex
New Forest Academy Hampshire
New Rickstones Academy Essex
Richmond Park Academy London
Ryde Academy Isle of Wight
Sir Herbert Leon Academy Milton Keynes
Tamworth Enterprise College Staffordshire
Tendring Technology College Essex
The Rawlett School Staffordshire
Unity City Academy Middlesbrough
Winton Community Academy Hampshire

Special schools

Columbus School and College, Essex
Newlands Academy, London
Pioneer School, Essex
The Ridge Academy, Cheltenham
Wishmore Cross Academy, Surrey

Former primary schools

Greenfield Academy, Gloucestershire
Molehill Copse Primary Academy, Kent
Oaks Primary Academy, Kent
Peak Academy, Gloucestershire
Weston Park, Isle of Wight
Tree Tops Primary Academy, Kent

Former secondary schools 

Childwall Sports and Science Academy Liverpool
East Point Academy Suffolk
Eston Park Academy Middlesbrough
Gillbrook Academy North Yorkshire
Tendring Enterprise Studio School Clacton-on-sea
The Duston School Northamptonshire
Swallow Hill Academy Leeds
Millbrook Academy Gloucestershire
Everest Academy Hampshire
Cordeaux Academy Lincolnshire
Sandown Bay Academy Isle of Wight

Governance and trustees

An article in The Guardian Newspaper looking into diversity and equal opportunities amongst Academy chains found that AET's board listed 8 trustees in Spring 2016, all of whom were white and male. When challenged about how this fitted with the trusts claims to promote diversity, AET accepted that improvement was needed and stated "We are taking steps to increase the diversity of our board of trustees. We hope to make an announcement about new appointments in the near future."  As of May 2020 the composition of the board has changed, with 3 women acting as trustees.

In December 2015, the Times Education Supplement noted that the DfE had intervened with AET and now had its own representatives attending AET board meetings. It stated that "It has emerged that the situation at the Academies Enterprise Trust (AET), which runs 68 schools throughout the country, has become so serious that representatives from the Department for Education now sit in on the trust’s board meetings. The government has said that it makes such a move if it has “concerns” about an academy chain."

References

External links
Academies Enterprise Trust official website
AET – Primary Schools
AET – Secondary schools
AET – Special schools

 
Organisations based in Essex
2008 establishments in England
Multi-academy trusts